Carlo Bernari (born in Naples on October 13, 1909; died in Rome on October 22, 1992) is the pseudonym under which Italian author Carlo Bernard is known.

Life and career 
He had no formal education after grade seven, when he was expelled, but read widely in philosophy and art. At an early point he became interested in avant-garde art and experimentalism. He also became close to leftist intellectuals and artists His first novel, Tre Operai (Three Workers), concerned workers issues in Naples. The book may have been a precursor to neo-realism and reportedly angered Benito Mussolini who felt there was Communism in it.

Awards 
In 1950, he shared the Viareggio Prize with Francesco Jovine. In 1962, he was nominated for an Academy Award for Best Original Screenplay for his work on the screenplay of The Four Days of Naples.

Selected filmography
 The Two Sergeants (1936)

References 

20th-century Italian screenwriters
1909 births
1992 deaths
Writers from Naples
20th-century Italian novelists
20th-century Italian male writers
Viareggio Prize winners
Italian male novelists
Italian male screenwriters